The Slowe-Burrill House is a Queen Anne-style house in the Brookland neighborhood of Washington, D.C. Built in 1890, the home was occupied from 1922 to 1937 by Lucy Slowe and Mary Burrill, notable African American educators who are thought by historians to have been a couple. The house was listed on the National Register of Historic Places in 2020 for its significance to African American and LGBT history.

History 
The house at 1256 Kearney Street NE was built for the original owner James T. Ward, an Irish immigrant, in 1890. It is a two-and-a-half-story structure in Queen Anne style.

Lucy Slowe and Mary Burrill, two African American educators, bought the house together in 1922 after Slowe was appointed Dean of Women at Howard University.

At a time when lesbian relationships were extremely taboo, Slowe and Burrill kept their romantic relationship under wraps professionally, but their close friends treated them as a couple. They frequently used the property's spacious rear yard for social gatherings of African-American women intellectuals.

Howard president Mordecai W. Johnson at one point pressured Slowe to move onto campus, but she fought to remain in the house at 1256 Kearney. The pair lived there together for 15 years until Slowe's death in 1937, after which a mourning Burrill sold the house and moved into an apartment near Howard.

The D.C. Preservation League sought preservation status for the house based on the historical significance of its former occupants. It was listed on the National Register of Historic Places on October 5, 2020.

See also 

 National Register of Historic Places listings in Washington, D.C.
 Lucy Diggs Slowe
 Mary P. Burrill
 Dr. Franklin E. Kameny House
 The Furies Collective

References 

Houses on the National Register of Historic Places in Washington, D.C.
Houses completed in 1890
Houses in Washington, D.C.
Queen Anne architecture in Washington, D.C.
Brookland (Washington, D.C.)
African-American history of Washington, D.C.
Lesbian culture in Washington, D.C.
LGBT history in the United States
LGBT African-American culture